Servier Laboratories (French: Laboratoires Servier, often abbreviated to Servier) is an international pharmaceutical company governed by a non-profit foundation, with its headquarters in France (Suresnes).

The consolidated turnover for the 2018 financial year was €4.2 billion. Servier is the leading French independent pharmaceutical company, and the second largest French pharmaceutical company. It has branches in 149 countries, achieving 82% of its sales outside France. The company reportedly invests a little under 25% of its turnover in research and development, which occupies 3,000 of its 22,000 employees worldwide. The company's production sites produced 853 million drug boxes in 2013.

The Servier Clinical Support Unit in Gidy (near Orléans), which produces drugs for clinical trials, is the largest unit of its kind in Europe. Servier Laboratories is a full member of the European Federation of Pharmaceutical Industries and Associations (EFPIA).

In 2018, Servier finalized the acquisition of Shire’s oncology branch in Boston and named David K. Lee as CEO. The official opening of Servier's new U.S. headquarters took place in 2019.

In 2009, Mediator, an amphetamine-based Servier drug originally developed for weight loss in people with diabetes but often prescribed off-label as a dieting aid, was withdrawn from the market after being linked to 500–2000 deaths in France. Further investigations found that many previous safety alerts on that drug had been either missed or covered up, possibly due to the improper influence of the company.

Product portfolio
Notable products:
Gliclazide (Diamicron, Diamicron MR) — antidiabetic drug
Indapamide (Fludex SR, Natrilex SR, Lozide) — diuretic
Ivabradine (Procoralan) — antianginal drugs
Perindopril (Coversyl) — ACE inhibitor
Strontium ranelate (Protelos) — osteoporosis agent
Tianeptine (Stablon) — antidepressant, indirect alteration of AMPA and NMDA glutamate receptor activity
Trimetazidine (Vastarel MR) — antianginal drug.

Other products:
Agomelatine (Valdoxan, Melitor, Thymanax)
Almitrine (Duxil, Vectarion)
Amineptine (Survector, Maneon, Directim)
Benfluorex (Mediaxal)
Carbutamide (Glucidoral)
Daflon 500
Fenspiride (Pneumorel)
Fotemustine (Muphoran)
Fusafungine (Locabiotal)
Gliclazide (Diamicron)
Indapamide (Natrilix, Tertensif, Lozide)
Pegaspargase (Oncaspar) — Acute lymphoblastic leukemia treatment 
Perindopril (Coversyl, Prestarium)
Perindopril/indapamide (Preterax, Coversyl Plus)
Piribedil (Trivastal retard)
Rilmenidine (Hyperium)
Tianeptine (Coaxil, Stablon)
Sodium alginate (Pseudophage)
Sulbutiamine (Arcalion)
Tertatolol (Artex)
Vitamins (Vitathion)

Collaborative research
As well as internal research and development activities, Servier undertakes publicly funded collaborative research projects with industrial and academic partners. One example, in the area of non-clinical safety assessment, is the InnoMed PredTox. The company is expanding its activities in joint research projects within the framework of the Innovative Medicines Initiative of EFPIA and the European Commission.

In addition to these, Servier engages in research and licensing collaborations across the pharmaceutical and biotechnology industry.  These collaborations include:
In Cardiology: XENTION (UK, 2013), AMGEN (USA, 2013), MIRAGEN (USA, 2011), ARMGO (USA, 2006)
In Diabetes: INTARCIA (USA, 2014)
In Metabolic diseases: INTERCEPT - TGR5 agonists (USA, 2011), GENFIT (FR, 2004)
In Neurology (MS): GENEURO (CH, 2014)
In Oncology: CTI BIOPHARMA (USA, 2014), NOVARTIS (CH, 2014), CELLECTIS (FR, 2014), NERVIANO (IT, 2013), EOS (IT) / CLOVIS (USA, 2012), BIOINVENT (SE, 2012), MACROGENICS (USA, 2011/12), GALAPAGOS (NDL, 2011), BIOREALITES (FR, 2011), PHARMACYCLICS - HDAC inhibitor (USA, 2009), HYBRIGENICS (FR, 2007/2011)	VERNALIS (UK, 2007/2011)
In Orphan Diseases/Cardiology/Diabetes:  XOMA (USA, 2010)
In Osteoporosis & Osteoarthritis: OSTEOLOGIX (USA, 2010), GALAPAGOS (NDL, 2010), KAROS (USA, 2010), NORDIC BIOSCIENCE (DK, 2006/2010)

Servier acquired Symphogen in 2020.

Controversy 
Servier Laboratories has been the object of worldwide scandal for creating and distributing a weight-loss drug called Mediator, which may have killed up to 2,100 people.

The movie 150 Milligrams, by director Emmanuelle Bercot, features Dr. Irène Frachon discovering that Mediator pills cause heart valve problems/deaths and how in 2009 she starts an uphill battle against the producer and the French health authorities.

In March 2021, Servier was sentenced to a fine of 2.7 million euros for aggravated deception and involuntary manslaughter, however it was acquitted of fraud charges. The court also ordered the company to pay several hundred million euros in damages to the 6,500 plaintiffs, and one of its leading managers was sentenced to four years on probation. The  French medical agency ANSM was fined 300,000 euros for failing proper supervision.

References

External links

 

 
Pharmaceutical companies established in 1954
1954 establishments in France
French brands
Suresnes